Richard Spicer may refer to:

Richard Spicer alias Newport, MP for Portsmouth
Richard de Spicer, MP for Coventry
Richard Spicer (MP for Huntingdon)